High Onn is a hamlet near the village of Wheaton Aston, in the English county of Staffordshire.


See also
Listed buildings in Church Eaton

References 
A-Z Great Britain Road Atlas (page 72)

Hamlets in Staffordshire
Borough of Stafford